Sam Jeffries (born 20 May 1992) is an Australian rugby union player who currently plays as a lock for the NEC Green Rockets in the Japan Top League and previously played as a lock for the Melbourne Rebels in the Super Rugby competition since 2014.

Career

Despite being born and raised in Queensland, Jeffries initially made a name for himself playing for Sydney University in the Shute Shield.  His performances at that level won him a spot in the Melbourne Rebels extended playing squad for the 2014 Super Rugby season.

Following the departures of experienced second-row forwards Hugh Pyle and Chris Thomson at the conclusion of the 2014 season, the Rebels announced that Jeffries would be a part of their first-team squad for at least the next 2 years. Sam will be playing for the NEC Green Rockets in Japan before returning to the Melbourne Rebels in 2019.

International

Jeffries represented Australia Under 20 at the 2012 IRB Junior World Championship in South Africa.

Super Rugby statistics

References

1992 births
Living people
Australian rugby union players
Rugby union locks
Melbourne Rebels players
Melbourne Rising players
Rugby union players from Brisbane
Australian expatriate rugby union players
Expatriate rugby union players in Japan
Green Rockets Tokatsu players
Urayasu D-Rocks players